Ignaz Ludwig (born 1901, date of death unknown) was an Austrian footballer. He played in three matches for the Austria national football team from 1924 to 1926.

References

External links
 

1901 births
Year of death missing
Austrian footballers
Austria international footballers
Place of birth missing
Association footballers not categorized by position